The 1953 Pacific typhoon season has no official bounds; it ran year-round in 1953, but most tropical cyclones tend to form in the northwestern Pacific Ocean between June and December. These dates conventionally delimit the period of each year when most tropical cyclones form in the northwestern Pacific Ocean.

The scope of this article is limited to the Pacific Ocean, north of the equator and west of the international date line. Storms that form east of the date line and north of the equator are called hurricanes; see 1953 Pacific hurricane season. Tropical Storms formed in the entire west Pacific basin were assigned a name by the Fleet Weather Center on Guam.

Systems

Typhoon Irma
This storm weakened and dissipated before it hit the Philippines.

Typhoon Judy

Judy skirted the Philippines and Taiwan then struck the Southern Japanese island of Kyushu. 37 people were killed and 15 were missing.

Tropical Storm 04W

Super Typhoon Kit

Typhoon Lola

Typhoon Mamie

Super Typhoon Nina

Nina was a major storm. It made landfall in China as a Category 4 tropical cyclone.

Tropical Storm 09W

Typhoon Ophelia
Ophelia hit Hong Kong and Vietnam.

Typhoon Phyllis

Typhoon Rita
Rita hit China as a tropical storm.

Tropical Storm 13W

Typhoon Susan

Susan hit Hong Kong.

Super Typhoon Tess

Typhoon Tess struck the Central Honshū Island in Japan. 393 people were killed and 85 were missing.

Tropical Storm 16W

JMA Tropical Storm 15

Typhoon Viola

Typhoon Winnie

Typhoon Alice

Typhoon Betty
Betty hit Hong Kong and then took an unusual track; going from west to east.

Typhoon Cora
Cora crossed the northern Philippines and hit its peak strength, then rapidly weakened and dissipated.

Tropical Storm 22W

Tropical Storm 23W

Super Typhoon Doris

A rare late-season Super Typhoon. Did not affect land.

Storm names

See also

 1953 Pacific hurricane season
 1953 Atlantic hurricane season
 1953 North Indian Ocean cyclone season
 Australian region cyclone seasons: 1952–53 1953–54
 South Pacific cyclone seasons: 1952–53 1953–54
 South-West Indian Ocean cyclone seasons: 1952–53 1953–54

References